Nicolas Jaoul is a French anthropologist and documentary film maker. He is a researcher in Anthropology at CNRS, National Centre for Scientific Research, Paris. His areas of interest are political anthropology of Dalit emancipation. He did his PhD research in the state of Uttar Pradesh in India. He released his documentary film Sangharsh - Times of Strife based on dalit struggle in Kanpur between 1997 and 2001.

See also 
 Dalit studies
 Christophe Jaffrelot
 Gail Omvedt

References

External links 
 The ‘Righteous Anger’ of the Powerless Investigating Dalit Outrage over Caste Violence - Nicolas Jaoul
 Learning the use of symbolic means: Dalits, Ambedkar statues and the state in Uttar Pradesh, Nicolas Jaoul June 1, 2006

French anthropologists
Anthropologists of religion
Cross-cultural studies
Year of birth missing (living people)
Living people